Wahooti Fandango is the second album by Australian band Custard. It was released in 1994 and peaked at number 89 on the ARIA Charts in June 1995.

Title
McCormack said, "Wahooti is just a slang term for marijuana… Fandango… we had a poster once that said "Custard meet Fandango", and I thought, well 'Fandango' sounds good. 'Wahooti', I don't know… Matthew [guitarist] will like it if there's a drug reference there you've got Matthew onside. So I think it just means 'Marijuana Party', I guess."

Reception
In 1997, Rolling Stone Australia named it in their best 100 Australian albums of all time, saying, "Custard delivered on the pop promise the "Rockfish Anna" and "Gastanked" EPs with the wit, charm and style of Wahooti Fandango. Drawing on a vast array of influences (from the art-rock of Pere Ubu, Devo and Sonic Youth to country ballads and big band swing), Custard's casual, whimsical approach to their own music often masks the degree of craft underlying songs. In 2021, Loverama replaced it in the list.

Track listing

Charts

References

1994 albums
Custard (band) albums